Özkan Yıldırım (born 10 April 1993) is a German professional footballer who plays as an attacking midfielder for Hekimoğlu Trabzon.

Club career
On 14 May 2016, the last day of the 2015–16 Bundesliga season, Yıldırım made his first-team return from injury coming onto the pitch in the 77th minute of Werder Bremen's 1–0 win over Eintracht Frankfurt which kept Werder in the Bundesliga.

On 30 June 2016, Yıldırım signed a two-year contract with 2. Bundesliga side Fortuna Düsseldorf.

On 31 August 2017, he transferred to league rivals Eintracht Braunschweig having agreed a two-year contract until summer 2019. At the end of the season, following Braunschweig's relegation to the 3. Liga, he was released from his contract.

In September 2018, Yıldırım trialled with 2. Bundesliga SV Darmstadt 98. Three weeks later, in early October, Darmstadt announced their decision to not sign Yıldırım.

In January 2020, after being without a club for 1.5 years, Yıldırım joined Turkish second-tier side Menemenspor. He left the club at the end of his contract on 31 May 2020.

References

External links
 
 
 
 

1993 births
Living people
People from Sulingen
Footballers from Lower Saxony
German people of Turkish descent
German footballers
Germany youth international footballers
Germany under-21 international footballers
Association football midfielders
Bundesliga players
2. Bundesliga players
3. Liga players
TFF First League players
SV Werder Bremen II players
SV Werder Bremen players
Fortuna Düsseldorf players
Eintracht Braunschweig players
Menemenspor footballers